Gabriele Sabatini (born March 22, 1976) is an Italian professional football coach and a former player. He is the manager of Fezzanese in Serie D.

Coaching career
On 5 June 2017, he was appointed head coach of fifth-tear (Eccellenza) club Fezzanese. He led the club to promotion to Serie D in his first season with the club.

References

1976 births
People from La Spezia
Footballers from Liguria
Living people
Association football midfielders
Italian footballers
Pisa S.C. players
U.S. Viterbese 1908 players
A.C. Cuneo 1905 players
Italian football managers
Sportspeople from the Province of La Spezia